Mátyás Katona (born 30 December 1999) is a Hungarian football midfielder who plays for OTP Bank Liga club Fehérvár.

Career
On 14 February 2023, Katona signed a three-year contract with Fehérvár.

Career statistics

References

External links
 
 

1999 births
Footballers from Budapest
Living people
Hungarian footballers
Association football midfielders
Újpest FC players
Vác FC players
Fehérvár FC players
Nemzeti Bajnokság I players
Nemzeti Bajnokság II players